Middle America may refer to:

 Middle America (Americas), a region in the mid-latitudes in the Americas
 Middle America (United States), a region of the United States representing the country's interior and non-urban "heartland"
 American middle class, a social class in the United States
 Midwestern United States, region representing the north-central parts of the United States
 "Middle America" (song), a song by Stephen Malkmus and the Jicks

See also 
 Central America (disambiguation)
 Mesoamerica (disambiguation)
 Heartland (United States)
 Island Caribs
 Caribbean
 Grenada